There are 72 Grade II* listed buildings in the city of Brighton and Hove, England. Queen Elizabeth II granted city status in 2000.

In England, a building or structure is defined as "listed" when it is placed on a statutory register of buildings of "special architectural or historic interest" by the Secretary of State for Culture, Media and Sport, a Government department, in accordance with the Planning (Listed Buildings and Conservation Areas) Act 1990.  English Heritage, a non-departmental public body, acts as an agency of this department to administer the process and advise the department on relevant issues.  There are three grades of listing status.  Grade I, the highest, is defined as being of "exceptional interest"; Grade II* is used for "particularly important buildings of more than special interest"; and Grade II, the lowest, is used for buildings of "special interest".

Brighton was founded on top of the sea-facing cliffs where the South Downs meet the English Channel.  A series of valleys allowed transport routes to develop towards Lewes, London and other important settlements.  Although Neolithic settlement has been confirmed, the Anglo-Saxons were the first permanent settlers; the population was about 400 by the time of the Domesday survey in 1086.  Its neighbour Hove, on flatter, more fertile land to the west, developed concurrently but independently: its existence was recorded in 1288, and two separate prebends (similar to benefices) existed by 1291.  Fishing, farming and smuggling drove the economy, but decline set in during the Middle Ages and persisted until the 19th century.  Coastal flooding destroyed buildings on many occasions, the parish church fell into ruins, and the population—almost all poor—numbered about 100 in 1801.

Brighton became fashionable as a holiday destination and health resort in the mid-18th century, and royal patronage (particularly by the flamboyant Prince Regent) increased its popularity with high society and the upper classes.  Day-trippers and longer-term visitors from other social classes soon followed, and by the early 19th century the town was Britain's foremost seaside resort.  Developments such as Royal Crescent, Regency Square, Oriental Place and Park Crescent characterised the bold architectural vision of the town's new residents; the design triumvirate of Amon Wilds, Amon Henry Wilds and Charles Busby were instrumental in realising these plans.  Hove's fortunes improved in line with Brighton's success, and developments such as Palmeira Mansions and Sir Isaac Goldsmid's Adelaide Crescent covered the fields between the ancient village of Hove and Brighton's continuous westward expansion.

The Vicar of Brighton, Rev. Henry Michell Wagner—a wealthy, progressive clergyman with strong Anglo-Catholic views and an interest in architecture—and his son and successor Rev. Arthur Wagner were responsible for an array of new churches throughout Brighton and Hove (especially in poorer residential areas); many are listed at Grade I, and the Grade II*-listed examples of St Martin's and St Paul's merely add to a stock of Victorian places of worship which has been described as one of the best outside London.  Elsewhere during the Victorian era, the former parish churches of both Brighton and Hove were rebuilt; an elaborate synagogue was provided for the Jewish population; Roman Catholic worship became established at the Classical-style St John the Baptist's Church; a new parish church was established in the form of Charles Barry's St Peter's; and several other churches were established.

Both towns were incorporated as boroughs: Brighton in 1854, Hove in 1898.  Expansion in the 20th century, as the urban area became a large regional centre, resulted in ancient villages being absorbed into the boroughs.  Hangleton, West Blatchington, Ovingdean, Rottingdean and others had historic buildings and long-established churches of their own; by 1928, Acts of Parliament had brought them into "Greater Brighton and Hove".  In 1997, the towns were officially united as a unitary authority; three years later, city status was secured.

Some listings include contributory fixtures such as surrounding walls or railings in front of the building.  These are summarised by notes alongside the building name.

Grade II* listed buildings

See also
Buildings and architecture of Brighton and Hove
List of conservation areas in Brighton and Hove

References

Notes
A. This listing includes attached walls and a light standard.
B. This listing includes attached walls, piers and railings.
C. This listing includes attached railings.
D. This listing includes the train sheds.
E. This listing includes attached gates, walls, piers and railings.
F. This listing includes attached walls.
G. This listing includes attached walls and railings.
H. This listing includes the attached gate.
I. This listing includes attached steps and walls.
J. This listing includes kerbstones surrounding the moat.
K. This listing includes the courtyard pool.
L. This listing includes kerbstones to the pool.

Sources

Bibliography

External links

 
Lists of Grade II* listed buildings in East Sussex